John T. Rogers was an American football and basketball coach. He was the second head football coach at Temple University in Philadelphia, serving for two seasons, from 1899 to 1900, and compiling a record of 4–8–2. Rogers was also the second head basketball coach at Temple, posting a 14–8 record in one season, 1899–1900.

Head coaching record

Football

References

Year of birth missing
Year of death missing
Temple Owls football coaches
Temple Owls men's basketball coaches